Ingleton Liburd (born 27 April 1961, in Trinidad) is a former Canadian cricket player. He was a top-order batsman who made his name playing for St Kitts and Leeward Islands Under-19s, but his career in the Caribbean ended when he moved to Canada where he established himself in the national side, playing in three ICC Trophies as well as the 1998 Commonwealth Games where he captained them. He served as president of the St. Kitts Cricket Association and as a territorial development officer for the West Indies Cricket Board before joining Cricket Canada as its cricket development officer in 2008. In 2009 he was the surprise choice as interim chief executive after the surprise removal of Atul Ahuja. He made his début for Canada in a match against Barbados in 1987. He represented Canada at three ICC Trophy tournaments and in 13 List A matches, including the cricket tournament at the 1998 Commonwealth Games.

He is currently the General Manager of Cricket Canada.

References
CricketArchive profile

Canadian cricketers
Cricketers at the 1998 Commonwealth Games
1961 births
Living people
Commonwealth Games competitors for Canada
Black Canadian sportspeople
Trinidad and Tobago emigrants to Canada
Coaches of the Canada national cricket team